The 1985 Castrol 500 was an endurance race for "Group A" Touring Cars staged at the Sandown International Motor Racing Circuit in Victoria on 15 September 1985. Race distance was 129 laps of the 3.878 km (1.928 mi) circuit, totaling 500.262 km.

The event was Round 3 of both the 1985 Australian Endurance Championship and the 1985 Australian Manufacturers' Championship. There were 36 starters, of which 21 were classified as finishers.

The race was won by the JPS Team BMW 635 CSi of Australian Touring Car Champion Jim Richards, and his co-driver Tony Longhurst. It was Longhurst's first major win in Australian touring car racing. JPS Team BMW made it a 1-2 finish when their second car, driven by Neville Crichton and on-loan Nissan team driver George Fury finished only a few seconds behind. Finishing in third place was the surprising Toyota Supra of Peter Williamson and 1985 Motorcraft Formula Ford Driver to Europe Series winner Tomas Mezera.

The 1985 Castrol 500 was the first time since 1972 that neither Peter Brock or Allan Moffat had won the Sandown enduro. 1984 Castrol 500 winner Brock, who claimed pole position with a time of 1:52.3 in his Holden Dealer Team VK Commodore, suffered engine failure after 41 laps, while Moffat, who was without a drive in 1985 due to Mazda not racing in Group A, was part of the ABC television commentary team.

Classes
The field was divided into three classes according to engine displacement.
Class A : 3001 cc to 6000 cc 
Class B : 2001 cc to 3000 cc 
Class C : Up to 2000 cc

Results

Top 10 Qualifiers

Race

Notes
 Pole Position: #05 Peter Brock - Holden Commodore (VK) - 1:52.3
 Fastest Lap: Dick Johnson / Larry Perkins - Ford Mustang - 1:53.6 (New lap record) 
 Race Time: 4:12:26.4

References

Australian Motor Racing Year, 1985/86
James Hardie 1000, 1985/86
Official Programme, Castrol 500, 14 and 15 September 1985
The Australian Racing History of Ford, 1989
The Official Racing History of Holden, 1988

External links
1985 Castrol 500 - full race
1985 Castrol 500, touringcarracing.net, as archived at web.archive.org

Motorsport at Sandown
Castrol 500
Pre-Bathurst 500